Bastien and Bastienne is a 1963 Australian television performance of the opera Bastien and Bastienne by Mozart. Australian TV drama was relatively rare at the time.

It was directed by Christopher Muir, who said: "We will not be presenting the opera as it was originally performed. We will be doing it in a style that will lend itself to TV, but we have, of course,
treated the work with great respect to the young Mozart's original intention."

Cast
 George Hegan as Bastien
 Eunice McCowan as Bastienne
 Janet Phillips
 Patricia Gough
 Roland Heimans

References

Australian television plays
Australian television plays based on operas